Arisaema ciliatum  is a plant species in the family Araceae. It is found in Lijang, Yunnan, China at elevations of 2500 meters.

References

ciliatum
Flora of China
Plants described in 1977